is a 2006 Japanese tokusatsu disaster film directed by Shinji Higuchi. It is an adaptation of the novel Japan Sinks and a remake of its earlier film adaptation Submersion of Japan, both released in the year 1973. It stars Tsuyoshi Kusanagi, Kou Shibasaki, Etsushi Toyokawa and Mao Daichi.

Plot
In 1995, Submersible pilot Toshio Onodera wakes up pinned inside his car in Numazu, Shizuoka Prefecture, after an earthquake wreaked havoc in the city and nearby Suruga Bay. As an aftershock triggers an explosion, a rescue helicopter led by Reiko Abe saves him and a young girl named Misaki while a nearby mountain (possibly Mount Fuji) erupts.

The 1990's have now passed: In Tokyo, geologists and volcanologists around the world become concerned about Japan; one predicts that the archipelagic nation will sink within 40 years. Japanese geoscientist Yusuke Tadokoro doubts the prediction and analyzes rocks in Kyushu, Hokkaido and Mangaia of the Cook Islands, where he hypothesizes that the rock came from the ancient continent of Japan after it split from Pangaea. Tadokoro realizes Japan will sink in 338.54 days instead of the original 40-year estimate. Tadokoro reports his theory to the Cabinet, recommending immediate action, but none of the ministers are convinced. He is ejected from the chamber, but not before he angrily explains to everyone how Japan will sink, with the destruction of the Fossa Magna and the eruption of Mount Fuji as the climax.

The next day, Prime Minister Yamamoto flies to China to make arrangements for the impending resettlement of Japanese refugees and appoints a close colleague, Saori Takamori, as disaster management minister. Tadokoro's predictions come to light as the Daisetsuzan Volcanic Group in Hokkaido bursts, followed by Mount Aso in Kyushu. The eruption destroys Yamamoto's plane alongside Kumamoto City.

As Takamori panics when she finds out about the Prime Minister's death, volcanic eruptions, earthquakes, and tsunamis rock Japan, starting from southwest to northeast. When the economy collapses, the government declares a state of emergency but acting Prime Minister Kyosuke Nozaki announces that the nation will take five years to sink. Because of Nozaki's indifference to the situation, Takamori runs to Tadokoro's laboratory, where he proposes using experimental N2 explosives drilled into the crust to separate the land from the megalith pulling it down. The minister, who is actually Tadokoro's ex-wife, calls for help from drillships around the world. Meanwhile, Hakodate City has been inundated by a massive tsunami.

Misaki, Reiko's family, and the rest of Tokyo's population are evacuated. Onodera confesses his true feelings for Reiko and wants her to go to England with him. A powerful aftershock strikes the Kansai region, killing thousands of people.

The next day, another massive earthquake hits Tokyo. The earthquake triggers a tsunami that destroys Shibuya, Minato, Chiyoda and Odaiba. Aftershocks from the earthquake and its associated effects hit Osaka, Kyoto, Nagano, Nagoya, and Sendai. Another tsunami strikes the city of Uozu in Toyama City, killing many survivors who had made their way to the city's port to await evacuation. Fukuoka is ablaze, shrouded in ash from volcanic eruptions. In the Chūbu region, many Tokyo evacuees are killed by a massive landslide while heading through a mountain pass in the Japanese Alps towards a refugee center, with people falling into the valley below. Reiko's family rescues Misaki, but they witness a crowded bridge collapse, killing more people who escaped the initial landslide.

Yuki Tatsuya, Onodera's fellow submersible pilot, dies in an attempt to activate the warheads from a central module. Onodera takes his place using an old submersible brought out of museum storage and spends a night with Reiko before the operation. Although he locates the detonation module, a sudden landslide damages his submersible to the point that it is running on emergency power. Onodera uses all the remaining power to move into position and install the detonator. Mount Fuji's imminent eruption is being witnessed by volcanologists. Onodera succeeds in his task and calmly awaits his death. The warheads explode, creating a chain of explosions along the seafloor which fractures the tectonic plate pulling Japan towards the subduction zone, freeing the nation from total destruction.

The success of the mission reaches Takamori aboard the amphibious carrier Shimokita, which has been converted as the Japanese government's temporary headquarters. Although she recommends that Nozaki address the refugees, her colleagues want her to do it instead, given her leadership during the crisis. She announces that people can finally return and holds a moment of silence in honor of Tatsuya and Onodera's sacrifice. In Fukushima Prefecture, Toshio's mother, who wanted to remain at her house until the end, is overjoyed when she sees birds return, a sign of his success. Reiko rescues her family as they look towards a bright sunrise before the credits start rolling, showing a drastically altered Japan.

Cast
 Tsuyoshi Kusanagi – Toshio Onodera, a submersible pilot working for Tadokoro
 Kou Shibasaki – Reiko Abe, a member of the Tokyo Hyper–Rescue team
 Etsushi Toyokawa – Yusuke Tadokoro, geologist
 Mao Daichi – Saori Takamori, science and disaster management minister
 Mitsuhiro Oikawa – Yuki Tatsuya, submersible pilot
 Mayuko Fukuda – Misaki Kuraki, young child found in Numazu
 Jun Kunimura – acting Prime Minister Kyosuke Nozaki
 Kazuo Kitamura - Minister of Justice
 Koji Ishizaka – Prime Minister Yamamoto
 Aiko Nagayama – Toshio Onodera's Mother
 
Tetsuro Tamba, who played Prime Minister Yamamoto in the 1973 movie, made a cameo appearance as Reiko's grandfather. It would be his final film role before dying on September 24, 2006. Gundam creator Yoshiyuki Tomino appeared as one of the refugees boarding a transport plane and as a Buddhist monk in Kyoto praying over a shipment of national treasures being sent abroad.

Releases

Home media
Prior to the release of the film, TBS released The Encyclopedia of Sinking of Japan, a special one-hour DVD featuring interviews with the cast and crew. A "Standard Version" was released on January 19, 2007.

Scale models
Takara Tomy released two batches of gashapon miniatures depicting various vehicles from the film in August 2006. The company followed it up in January 2007 with a 1/700 pre-assembled model of the Shimokita, which was released under its Microworld DX line.

Critical reception
The film garnered mixed reviews. Derek Elley of Variety lauded the visual effects, but regarded the drama elements as thin. Nix of Beyond Hollywood.com noted the ending as akin to Bruce Willis' character's sacrifice in Armageddon and the lines of some characters are practically the same as in Western disaster movies. Mark Schilling, a film reviewer for the Japan Times, stated the movie was all business in terms of the Hollywood-style effects graphically showing the devastation. He also took notice of Shibasaki's casting as Reiko Abe and the short conversation scenes as different from the 1973 movie, plus the "soft nationalism" of some characters opting to die in the chaos rather than leave the country.

References

External links
 Review of the film at Dreamlogic.net
 

Toho tokusatsu films
Japanese disaster films
2000s survival films
2006 films
Remakes of Japanese films
Films based on science fiction novels
Films based on Japanese novels
Films directed by Shinji Higuchi
Films scored by Taro Iwashiro
2000s Japanese films

fr:Sinking of Japan
ja:日本沈没
zh:日本沉沒